Adolf Portmann (27 May 1897 – 28 June 1982) was a Swiss zoologist.

Born in Basel, Switzerland, he studied zoology at the University of Basel and worked later in Geneva, Munich, Paris and Berlin, but mainly in marine biology laboratories in France (Banyuls-sur-Mer, Roscoff, Villefranche-sur-Mer) and Helgoland.

In 1931 he became professor of zoology in Basel. His main research areas covered marine biology and comparative morphology of vertebrates. His work was often interdisciplinary comprising sociological and philosophical aspects of life of animals and humans.

Portmann was known for his work in theoretical biology and his comparative studies on morphology and behavior. His research has influenced the field of biosemiotics.

Portmann died in Binningen near Basel on 28 June 1982.

Publications
Essai in Philosophical Zoology by Adolf Portmann: The Living Form and the Seeing Eye (1990)
Animal Forms and Patterns: A Study of the Appearance of Animals (1967)
Metamorphosis in Animals: The Transformations of the Individual and the Type (1964)
New Paths in Biology (1964)
Animals as Social Beings (1961)
The Earth as the Home of Life (1954)

References

Marine biologists
20th-century Swiss zoologists
1897 births
1982 deaths
Fellows of the Zoological Society of London
University of Basel alumni
Academic staff of the University of Basel